Pityotrichus is a genus of typical bark beetles in the family Curculionidae. There are at least three described species in Pityotrichus.

Species
These three species belong to the genus Pityotrichus:
 Pityotrichus barbatus Blackman, 1928
 Pityotrichus hesperius Bright, 1971
 Pityotrichus turkmenicus Mandelshtam & Petrov, 2006

References

Further reading

 
 
 

Scolytinae
Articles created by Qbugbot